The 2004 season was the New Orleans Saints' 38th in the National Football League (NFL). They matched their previous season's output of 8–8, and the team finished the season on a four-game winning streak, which was all the more remarkable because the Saints trailed at some point during every game. This record was equalled by the 2012 Cowboys, but before this season the 1978 Falcons and the 2002 Browns come closest to this record, winning eight games out of fifteen where they trailed at some point.

Offseason

NFL Draft

Personnel

Staff

Roster

Regular season

Schedule
During the 2004 regular season, the Saints' non-divisional conference opponents were primarily from the NFC West, although they also played the Minnesota Vikings from the NFC North, and the Dallas Cowboys from the NFC East. Their non-conference opponents were from the AFC West.

Standings

References

External links
2004 New Orleans Saints at Pro-Football-Reference.com

New Orleans Saints seasons
New Orleans Saints
New